The National Register of Health Service Psychologists (abbreviated National Register) (formerly the National Register of Health Service Providers in Psychology) is the largest credentialing organization for psychologists in the United States. Founded in 1974, the National Register was created to identify qualified Health Service Providers. Today, the National Register certifies 11,000 licensed psychologists as health service providers and reviews credentials for doctoral students. The National Register is a 501c3 nonprofit organization based in Washington DC.

Profile

Title of "Health Service Provider"
A Health Service Provider in psychology is a licensed/certified psychologist, at the independent practice level in his/her state, province, territory, or country, who is trained and experienced in the delivery of mental health prevention, consultation, assessment, and treatment of psychological conditions such as depression, anxiety disorder, PTSD, etc. (rev. 2022).

Benefits
Members of the National Register enjoy:
Distinction as a Health Service Provider
Expedited Licensure Mobility
Credentials Banking and Verification
Practice Profile Pages on www.findapsychologist.org
Discounts on Malpractice Liability Insurance
FREE Continuing Education
Publications
Awards
Scholarships
Legacy of Excellence DVD Series

The National Register is approved by the American Psychological Association (APA) to sponsor continuing education for psychologists. The National Register maintains responsibility for this program and its content.

National Register Recognized Credentials
The National Register recognizes the American Board of Professional Neuropsychology (ABN), American Board of Professional Psychology (ABPP), and the APA College of Professional Psychology.

Board of Directors
The nine-member Board of Directors, two of whom are non-psychologist public representatives, governs the National Register. Board members are solicited from among the Registrant population and elsewhere. They are elected by the Board for a four-year term and are eligible to reapply for a second term. Each year, all Board members sign a confidentiality agreement that includes a conflict of interest agreement. In addition, the National Register has written policies of whistleblower protection and document retention.

Committee on Professional Practice and Ethics (COPPE)
The National Register does not initiate or independently investigate complaints against Registrants; rather, any action by the COPPE is based upon documentation received from the investigation and adjudication of outside organizations, such as state/provincial psychology boards and associations, governmental bodies, and courts. Only when a question is raised concerning the possibility of "any significant misrepresentation in connection with his/her application for listing" does the National Register conduct its own investigation.

Designation
Designation is a joint effort of the Association of State and Provincial Psychology Boards (ASPPB) and the National Register. Programs that are designated have been reviewed by the ASPPB/National Register Designation Committee and have been found to meet the designation criterion which was developed at the 1977 National Conference on Education and Credentialing in Psychology. Therefore, graduates of designated programs typically will meet the educational requirements for licensing and for the National Register credential.

Outreach

Early Career Psychologists
The National Register works with Early Career Psychologists and ECP organizations to offer benefits tailored to ECPs, get early career perspective on important professional issues, and assist with professional development and recognition for new professionals. The National Register offers credentialing scholarships, which allow early career psychologists to become credentialed without paying any application fees.

Psychology Doctoral Students
The National Psychologist Trainee Register (NPTR) is the National Register’s credentials bank for psychology doctoral students and postdocs, and is the foundation for the National Register Health Service Provider in Psychology credential. Through the NPTR, doctoral students and postdocs bank their education and training credentials and verify that each credential meets national standards. For financially disadvantaged doctoral students, the National Register offers credentialing scholarships, which allow doctoral students to complete the NPTR and become credentialed upon initial licensure, without paying any application fees.

Consumers
The National Register promotes credentialed psychologists to the public through www.findapsychologist.org, a freely available database of 11,000 credentialed psychologists. The website also contains a wide variety of reviewed articles and web resources for consumers, as well as frequently asked questions and answers about seeking help from a psychologist.

History

Founding
The National Register was established in 1974 to meet the need for a system by which various insurers, governmental agencies, health services, and other organizations, as well as individual consumers, could identify licensed psychologists who have specific education, training and supervised experience in health services. Both the American Board of Professional Psychology (ABPP) and the American Psychological Association (APA) played a role in its establishment.

October 1, 1973 The American Psychological Association (APA) Board of Professional Affairs formally voted to recommend that APA request the American Board of Professional Psychology (ABPP) to establish a National Register of Health Service Providers in Psychology.

November 30, 1973 The APA Board of Directors "voted to request the Board of Directors of the American Board of Professional Psychology (ABPP) to establish a National Registry Council as outlined in the recommendations of the ad hoc Coordinating Committee for the National Registry of Health Service Providers in Psychology…."
March 1, 1974 ABPP Board of Trustees voted to implement the project.
June 1, 1974 Initial meeting of the twelve-member Council for the National Register of Health Service Providers in Psychology; "Health Service Provider in Psychology" defined; Criteria for credentialing established.
June 28, 1974 APA Board of Directors "was informed of the progress of the American Board of Professional Psychology (ABPP) in establishing the Council for the National Register of Health Service Providers in Psychology. It expressed its appreciation to ABPP for undertaking this important task and urged all eligible psychologists to support this endeavor."
September 1, 1974 Joint letter from APA President Bandura and National Register Chairman Zimet sent to all psychologists soliciting applications to the National Register.
December 20, 1974 Incorporation of the Council for the National Register of Health Service Providers in Psychology in the District of Columbia as a 501(c)(3) (charitable, educational) organization.
August 1, 1975 First edition of the National Register published listing 6,877 credentialed Health Service Providers in Psychology.

Review of International and Other Psychology Degrees
In 1997, the Maryland State Board of Examiners of Psychologists asked the National Register to evaluate doctoral programs of individuals trained in countries outside the United States and Canada and from other non-designated programs to determine the eligibility of applicants for admittance to the state licensing exam. This action was taken in order to open the application process to graduates of doctoral programs previously not eligible for licensure in Maryland. States Licensing Boards that currently list the National Register as an Approved Resource and/or have utilized the services of the National Register for evaluating doctoral degrees are as follows: District of Columbia, Hawaii, Iowa, Maine, Maryland, Montana, Oregon, Pennsylvania, and Washington.

External links

Non-profit organizations based in Washington, D.C.